The Conservation Farm Option Program was authorized by a provision of the 1996 farm bill (P.L. 104-127).  It is a pilot program for producers who received production flexibility payments to enter into a contract to consolidate payments at rates that were equivalent to payments that would otherwise be received from the Conservation Reserve Program, Wetlands Reserve Program, and/or the Environmental Quality Incentives Program in exchange for implementing practices to protect soil, water, and wildlife.

References 

United States Department of Agriculture programs
Federal Agriculture Improvement and Reform Act of 1996